Pachamama is a goddess revered by the indigenous peoples of the Andes. In Inca mythology  she is an "Earth Mother" type goddess, and a fertility goddess who presides over planting and harvesting, embodies the mountains, and causes earthquakes. She is also an ever-present and independent deity who has her own creative power to sustain life on this earth. Her shrines are hallowed rocks, or the boles of legendary trees, and her artists envision her as an adult female bearing harvests of potatoes or coca leaves. The four cosmological Quechua principles – Water, Earth, Sun, and Moon – claim Pachamama as their prime origin. Priests sacrifice offerings of llamas, cuy (guinea pigs), children (The Capacocha Ritual) and elaborate, miniature, burned garments to her. Pachamama is the mother of Inti the sun god, and Mama Killa the moon goddess. Mama Killa is said to be the wife of Inti.

After the Spanish colonization of the Americas, they converted the native populations of the region to Roman Catholicism. Due to religious syncretism, the figure of the Virgin Mary was associated with that of the Pachamama for many of the indigenous people. 

As Andean cultures formed modern nations, the figure of Pachamama was still believed to be benevolent, generous with her gifts, and a local name for Mother Nature. In the 21st century, many indigenous peoples in South America base environmental concerns in these ancient beliefs, saying that problems arise when people take too much from nature because they are taking too much from Pachamama.

Etymology
Pachamama ( + ) is usually translated as Mother Earth. A more literal translation would be "World Mother" (in the Aymara and Quechua languages).
The Inca goddess can be referred to in multiple ways; the primary way being Pachamama. Other names for her are: Mama Pacha, La Pachamama, and Mother Earth.

Modern-day rituals

Pachamama and her son-husband, Inti, are worshiped as benevolent deities in the area known as Tawantinsuyu. Tawantinsuyu is the name of the former Inca Empire, and the region stretches through the Andean mountains in present-day Bolivia, Ecuador, Chile, Peru, and northern Argentina. People usually give a toast to honor Pachamama before meetings and festivities. In some regions, people perform a special kind of libation known as a challa on a daily basis. They spill a small amount of chicha on the floor, for the goddess, and then drink the rest.

Pachamama has a special worship day called Martes de challa (Challa's Tuesday). People  bury food, throw candies, and burn incense to thank Pachamama for their harvests. In some cases, celebrants assist traditional priests, known as yatiris in Aymara, in performing ancient rites to bring good luck or the good will of the goddess, such as sacrificing guinea pigs or burning llama fetuses (although this is rare today). The festival coincides with the Christian holiday of Shrove Tuesday, also celebrated among Catholics as Carnevale or Mardi Gras.

The central ritual to Pachamama is the Challa or Pago (payment). It is carried out during all of August, and in many places also on the first Friday of each month. According to Mario Rabey and Rodolfo Merlino, Argentine anthropologists who studied the Andean culture from the 1970s to the 1990s, 
"The most important ritual is the challaco. Challaco is a deformation of the Quechua words 'ch'allay' and 'ch'allakuy', that refer to the action to insistently sprinkle. In the current language of the campesinos of the southern Central Andes, the word challar is used in the sense of "to feed and to give drink to the land". The challaco covers a complex series of ritual steps that begin in the family dwellings the night before. They cook a special food, the tijtincha. The ceremony culminates at a pond or stream, where the people offer a series of tributes to Pachamama, including "food, beverage, leaves of coca and cigars."

Household rituals
Rituals to honor Pachamama take place all year, but are especially abundant in August, right before the sowing season. Because August is the coldest month of the winter in the southern Andes, people feel more vulnerable to illness. August is therefore regarded as a "tricky month." During this time of mischief, Andeans believe that they must be on very good terms with nature to keep themselves and their crops and livestock healthy and protected.  In order to do this, families perform cleansing rituals by burning plants, wood, and other items in order to scare evil spirits, who are thought to be more abundant at this time.  People also drink mate (a South American hot beverage), which is thought to give good luck.

On the night before August 1, families prepare to honor Pachamama by cooking all night. The host of the gathering then makes a hole in the ground. If the soil comes out nicely, this means that it will be a good year; if not, the year will not be bountiful. Before any of the guests are allowed to eat, the host must first give a plate of food to Pachamama. Food that was left aside is poured onto the ground and a prayer to Pachamama is recited.

Sunday parade
A main attraction of the Pachamama festival is the Sunday parade. The organizational committee of the festival searches for the oldest woman in the community and elects her the "Pachamama Queen of the Year." This election first occurred in 1949. Indigenous women, in particular senior women, are seen as incarnations of tradition and as living symbols of wisdom, life, fertility, and reproduction. The Pachamama queen who is elected is escorted by the gauchos, who circle the plaza on their horses and salute her during the Sunday parade. The Sunday parade is considered to be the climax of the festival.

New Age worship

Since the late 20th century, a New Age practice of worship to Pachamama has developed among Andean white and mestizo peoples. Believers perform a weekly ritual worship which takes place on Sundays and includes invocations to Pachamama in Quechua, although there may be some references in Spanish. They have a temple, which inside contains a large stone with a medallion on it, symbolizing the New Age group and its beliefs. A bowl of dirt on the right of the stone is there to represent Pachamama, because of her status as a Mother Earth. 

Certain travel agencies have drawn upon the emerging New Age movement in Andean communities (drawn from Quechua ritual practices) to urge tourists to visit Inca sites. Tourists visiting such sites as Machu Picchu and Cusco, are also offered the chance to participate in ritual offerings to Pachamama.

Pachamama and Christianity

Many rituals related to the Pachamama are practiced in conjunction with those of Christianity, to the point that many families are simultaneously Christian and pachamamistas.

According to scholar Manuel Marzal, in modern day Peru, the cult of Pachamama has, in some cases, taken on Christian characteristics or been reinterpreted within a Catholic religious framework. Rites like the offering to Pachamama have incorporated "certain Christian symbols and prayers" and have also been "the object of Christian reinterpretations," both implicit and explicit. One of these reinterpretations is that Pachamama represents the natural bounty created by God. For some Andeans, he writes, "Pachamama has lost its original identity and has changed into a symbol of the providence of the one God, or [...] a sacred reality that feeds humankind on behalf of God."

Along similar lines, Pope John Paul II, in two homilies delivered in Peru and Bolivia, identified homage to Pachamama as an ancestral recognition of divine providence that in some sense prefigured a Christian attitude toward creation. On February 3, 1985, he stated that "your ancestors, by paying tribute to the earth (Mama Pacha), were doing nothing other than recognizing the goodness of God and his beneficent presence, which provided them food by means of the land they cultivated." On May 11, 1988, he stated that God "knows what we need from the food that the earth produces, this varied and expressive reality that your ancestors called "Pachamama" and that reflects the work of divine providence as it offers us its gifts for the good of man."

Marzal also states that for some Andeans, Pachamama retains an "intermediary role" between God and man within a primarily Catholic framework similar to that of the saints. Some ethnographic scholars have also noted a syncretic identification of Pachamama with the Virgin Mary. Pachamama is sometimes syncretized as the Virgin of Candelaria.

In October 2019, native Amazonian artworks were displayed in the Vatican gardens, and in a Roman church, ahead of the Synod of Bishops for the Pan-Amazon region. Wooden sculptures in the form of a pregnant woman were wrongly labeled "Pachamama" in the media, and used as shorthand for them thereafter, despite not matching traditional representation of Pachamama, and the sculptures being called "Our Lady of the Amazon" at the event. Pope Francis, calling them Pachamama, apologized when they were stolen and thrown into the Tiber by assailants who accused them of idolatry. In his statement, the Pope clarified that there "was no idolatrous intention" in bringing the statues to the Vatican. Cardinal Gerhard Müller stated that "The great mistake was to bring the idols into the church, not to put them out."

Political usage

Belief in Pachamama features prominently in the Peruvian national narrative. Former President Alejandro Toledo held a symbolic inauguration on 28 July 2001 atop Machu Picchu. The ceremony featured a Quechua religious elder giving an offering to Pachamama. Some Andean intellectuals identify Pachamama as an example of autochthony.

Former Bolivian president Evo Morales invoked the name of Pachamama, as well as using  language and symbolism that appealed to Bolivia's indigenous population, in speeches throughout his presidency.

See also
 Atabey
 Bhumi
 Gaia
 Goddess movement
 Law of the Rights of Mother Earth
 Mother goddess
 Mother Nature
 Pachamama Raymi
 Willka Raymi
 Gastrotheca pacchamama

References

External links

Bolivia's offerings to Mother Earth, October 2007
Bolivian Indigenous Activist: We Must Respect Mother Earth, Our Pachamama – video by Democracy Now!
Bolivia enshrines natural world's rights with equal status for Mother Earth''

Aymara goddesses
Inca goddesses
Earth goddesses
Nature goddesses
Fertility goddesses
Mother goddesses
Agricultural goddesses
Harvest goddesses